List of how many forests and percentage of forest cover in India by state.

Tree density
Tree density is the quantification of how closely the trees are growing in a hectare area. It is not the exact number of trees in the forest but, serves as an estimate to the foresters..The tree density of an area should be mentioned by the working Plan officer (WPO) or Divisional Forest Officer (Working Plan) after his field inspection of the lowest possible forest unit or compartment in the CH-3 form of compartment history. The compartment history forms are to be maintained at the Forest range and Forest division offices. The working Plan code-2014 mentions in the para 105 that the density should also be mentioned on the stock map prepared by the WPO/DFO in decimal figures. The crown density is similar to the tree density. The forest area with density more than 0.4 are considered good forest area and forest area with less than 0.4 tree density are considered degraded forest.

Forest cover
Forest cover  is the total geographical area declared as forest by the government. As of 2021, the total forest cover in India is 80.9 million hectares , which is 24.62 percent of the total geographical area. There is a 1,540 sq.km increase in forest cover over 2019. Madhya Pradesh has the highest forest cover as per the area followed by the Arunachal Pradesh. Mizoram has the highest forest cover in terms of percentage of total geographical area.

Ministry of the environment forest and climate change used the mid resolution satellite data on LISS-III data from  Indian remote sensing satellite. Minister of environment forest and climate change Bhupendra Yadav released the Indian forest survey report 2021-22 on the 13 January 2022.

As per the report, 17 Indian states have a forest cover over 33%.

Forest cover over the years

2021 
The forest cover in 2021 in India by state and union territory as published by the Forest Survey of India (FSI) is shown in the table below.

Very Dense= All lands with tree canopy density of 70 percent ( 0.7 tree density) and above.

Moderately Dense= All lands with tree canopy density of 40 percent and more but less than 70 percent ( 0.4 to 0.7 tree density).

Open Forest= All lands with tree canopy density of 10 percent and more but less than 40 percent (0.1 to 0.4 tree density).

(Area in square kilometers)

2017 
The forest cover in 2017 in India by state and union territory as published by the Forest Survey of India (FSI) is shown in the table below.

Very Dense= All lands with tree canopy density of 70 percent ( 0.7 tree density) and above.

Moderately Dense= All lands with tree canopy density of 40 percent and more but less than 70 percent ( 0.4 to 0.7 tree density).

Open Forest= All lands with tree canopy density of 10 percent and more but less than 40 percent (0.1 to 0.4 tree density).

Scrub= All forest lands with poor tree growth mainly of small or stunted trees canopy density less than 10 percent (Less than 0.1 tree density).

(Area in square kilometers)

2015 
According to Forest Survey of India (FSI), the forest cover by State/UT in India in 2015 is listed below.

Very Dense= All lands with tree canopy density of 70 percent and above.

Moderately Dense= All lands with tree canopy density of 40 percent and more but less than 70 percent.

Open Forest= All lands with tree canopy density of 10 percent and more but less than 40 percent.

(Area in square kilometers)

See also 
List of countries by forest area
List of forests in India
Indian Forest Service

References 

.
Flora of India by state or union territory
India geography-related lists
Forestry-related lists
India environment-related lists